This is a list of American films that were released in 2004.

Box office 
The highest-grossing American films released in 2004, by domestic box office gross revenue, are as follows:

January–March

April–June

July–September

October–December

See also 
 List of 2004 box office number-one films in the United States
 2004 in the United States

References

External links 

 

Films
Lists of 2004 films by country or language
2004